Chapin's flycatcher (Muscicapa lendu) is a bird species in the Old World flycatcher family (Muscicapidae). It is found in the Democratic Republic of the Congo, Kenya, Uganda, and possibly Rwanda. The Itombwe flycatcher was formerly considered conspecific.

Its natural habitat is subtropical or tropical moist montane forests. It is threatened by habitat loss.

The common name commemorates the American ornithologist James Paul Chapin.

References

Chapin's flycatcher
Birds of Sub-Saharan Africa
Chapin's flycatcher
Chapin's flycatcher
Taxonomy articles created by Polbot
Taxobox binomials not recognized by IUCN